Albert König may refer to:

 Albert König (optician) (1871−1946), German optician known for the König eyepiece
 Albert König (painter) (1881–1944), German painter born in Eschede

See also 
 Arthur König (1856–1901), German physicist who was known for his work on physiological optics
 Arthur König (astronomer)